Ym:Stammen was an ethnic-influenced post-punk band from Oslo, Norway that released six albums. The group was founded in 1983 by Trygve Mathiesen.

The music was a mix of Norse-inspired chanting and primitive rock, with some pop elements. They labeled their music as Nordic stomp with hysterical lyrics influenced by philosophy, religion, and surrealism, put together by Mathiesen. The band toured Northern Europe and Canada throughout the 1980s and 1990s. With their Nordic pagan approach, the band had a big influence on the Norwegian Black Metal scene. Ym:stammen gave their last performance on midsummer night in 1999 in Oslo.

In August 2022, they played a reunion concert at the Norwegian metal festival Midgardsblot in Borre.

Members
Trygve Mathiesen – vocals (1983–1999)
Christopher Nielsen – Indian banjo (1983)
Torgeir Tunhold-Hanssen – drums (1983)
Trygve Johansen – synth (1983)
Tore Halland – guitar (1983)
Oddvar Karlsmyr – drums, vocals, guitar (1984–89)
Anne Grete Kolås – drums, vocals, flute (1984)
Dag-Olav Sivertsen – guitar, percussion, vocals (1985–86)
Harald Beckstrøm – guitar, bass (1987–89)
Jon Anders Strand – bass, guitar (1987–89)
Christian Refsum – drums (1987–89)
Paul Arvid Jørgensen – synth (1987–89)
Jo Langeland – guitar, vocals (1989–99)
Andreas Eriksen – percussion (1989–94)
Tarjei Rønnow – bass (1991–94)
Øyvind Rauset – fiddle (1991–94)
Kai Lundewall – drums (1991–99)
Torstein Kvenaas – flutes (1991–93)
Are Hofstad – saxophones (1992–93)
Torben Snekkestad – saxophones (1994–96)
Douglas Alexandre – bass (1995–99)
Tore Ylvisaker – synth (1995–99)

Key gigs
May 16, 1984 Trikkestallen, Majorstua, Oslo, Norway (debut)
July 14, 1984 Weird Music Festival (Sprø Musikk-festivalen) at Arendal, Norway
July 17, 1988 WOMAD Festival, Bracknell, London, UK
July 25, 1988 Dublin 1000 Years Festival, RDS Hall, Dublin, Ireland
July 29, 1988 Baggott's Inn, Dublin, Ireland
August 13, 1988 Hultsfred Festival Festival, Sweden
December 18, 1992 Mid winter Blot, Sentrum Scene, Oslo, Norway
July 24, 1993 Nordic House in the Faroe Islands
June 11, 1994 TMV Festival, Trondheim, Norway
June 24, 1994 Juoensuu Festival, Finland
July 2, 1994 World Stage, Roskilde Festival, Denmark
July 21, 1994 Quart Festival, Kristiansand, Norway
June 21, 1998 North Country Fair Festival, Alberta, Canada
June 23, 1999 Blaa, Oslo, Norway (last gig)

Discography

Albums
Overvintrende, Likvidér LIKV 4009, 1984 (MC-30)
I Vi-landet, Likvidér LIKV 4021, 1984 (MC-30)
Dvergmål, Cicada C010, 1987 (LP)
Enøyd, Tatra TATCD 006, 1992 (CD, LP, MC)
Dvergmål, Tatra TAT 011, 1993 (rerelease with 10 bonus tracks, CD)
Ulv! Ulv!, Grappa GRCD 4059, 1994 (CD)
Guden-i-Steinen, Grappa GRCD 4117, 1997 (CD)

Singles
"Solbeven/Alle Myter", 7-inch, Transmission TR 02, 1987
"Overkjørt av Hjul og Vogn/Splid", 7-inch, Tatra TAT 005, 1991
"Endelig (Har Tingene Funnet Sin Form)/Synge Gjør Vi (ikke For å Glemme vår Sorg Men) For å Styrke Vår Tro", CDS Grappa GRCDS 145, 1993
"(Vi Blir) Fisk/Solbeven", CDS Grappa GRCDS 148, 1994
"Ym-stammen Hevner Geronimo" – Hevnerkvadet (Radio San Carlo-Reservatet-mix/Hevnerkvadet (bakholdsangrep-mix)/Hevnerkvadet (Slå til før daggry-mix), Remixes by DJ Geronimo, CDS Grappa GRCDS 153, 1994 (unreleased)
"Tusen Års Fortielse" – (Tusenårsmix/Rottefangerversjonen/Versjon for verdensånden/Millenium-mix), bonus: live Roskilde-festival 1994: Budbringere/Styrke Vår Tro/Navnet-Overvintr, CDS Grappa GRCDS 153, 1995
"Store Aleksander", Promo single Grappa GRCDS 164, 1997
"Store Aleksander" (Taxi-mix)/Beherske Verden (Myggen-mix)/Store Aleksander (album-versjon)/Store Aleksander (Kjøkken-versjon), CDS Grappa GRCDS 169, 1997
"Ym-stammen meets Mel Simpson – Guden-i-Steinen: the remix" (Radio-edit Cheeky-mix/Sneaky-mix/Cheeky-mix/album-versjon), Remixes by Mel Simpson (from Us3), CDS Grappa GRCDS 181, 1997

External links
 discography Ym:Stammen 

Norwegian musical groups
Norwegian post-punk music groups